Melica yajiangensis, is a species of grass that is endemic to China.

Description
The species is perennial and caespitose, which is clumped and have absent rhizomes. The species leaf-sheaths are tubular and subequal with one of their length being closed and have a glabrous surface. They also have ribbed surface which is also rough and scaberulous as well.

The panicle branches are capillary and carry distant spikelets. Florets are diminished at the apex.

Palea is ciliolate, have scabrous keels and is 2-veined.

Ecology
It blooms from August to September.

References

yajiangensis
Endemic flora of China
Flora of Asia